The Greenwich Maritime Centre (GMI) is a part of the University of Greenwich. Established in 1998, it provides a specialist postgraduate and research institute within the large multi-faculty University of Greenwich. The aims of the GMC are to engage in and facilitate scholarly research, to disseminate and publicise research findings, to provide postgraduate teaching, to develop maritime education, to act as a forum for exploration of maritime issues, to serve as a source of expertise for business and government and to provide cost-effective consultancy services. The GMC provides an active centre for studying maritime history and is located in The Old Royal Naval College, Greenwich, across the road from the National Maritime Museum.

External links
 Official website

Maritime Centre
Education in the Royal Borough of Greenwich
Maritime colleges in the United Kingdom
Educational institutions established in 1998
1998 establishments in England